Filippos is a masculine given name. It may refer to:

 Filippos Filippou (athlete), Cypriot distance runner
 Filippos Filippou (footballer), Cypriot footballer
 Filippos Karvelas, Greek gymnast
 Filippos Margaritis, Greek photographer
 Filippos Pliatsikas, frontman of the Greek band Pyx Lax
 Filippos, music producer and Dj of electronic music 

Greek masculine given names